Dance Until We Die is the third studio album by Swiss recording artist Luca Hänni and Christopher S. It was released by Future Soundz on 11 April 2014. The album peaked at number 6 on the Swiss Albums Chart. The album includes the singles "I Can't Get No Sleep" and "Good Time".

Track listing

Charts

References

External links
 

2014 albums
Luca Hänni albums